Kells railway station was a railway station in Kells, County Meath, Ireland. The station opened in 1853. It was established by the Dublin and Drogheda Railway to serve a new branch from the Dublin–Navan railway line. The branch was closed to passengers in 1958, and closed for all uses in 1963.

References 

Disused railway stations in County Meath
Railway stations opened in 1853
Railway stations closed in 1958
Railway stations closed in 1963

Railway stations in the Republic of Ireland opened in 1853